The speaker of the House of Commons is the presiding officer of the lower house of the Parliament of Canada. A member of Parliament (MP), they are elected at the beginning of each new parliament by fellow MPs. The speaker's role in presiding over Canada's House of Commons is similar to that of speakers elsewhere in other countries that use the Westminster system.

The 37th and current speaker of the House of Commons is Anthony Rota, since December 5, 2019. The speaker with the longest tenure is Peter Milliken who was elected for four consecutive terms lasting 10 years, 124 days.

Role
In Canada it is the speaker's responsibility to manage the House of Commons and supervise its staff. It is also the speaker's duty to act as a liaison with the Senate and the Crown. They are to rule over the house and have the government answer questions during the question period as well as keep decorum with the house. The speaker receives a salary of CA$274,500 ($185,800 as an MP in addition to $88,700 as speaker) and has use of a small apartment, in the House of Commons, and an official residence, The Farm, an estate located at Kingsmere in Gatineau Park, Quebec, across the river from Ottawa. for the management of the House of Commons campus, and the 2,000 individuals who work there. In 2015 the speaker managed a budget of $414 million.

Along with the Senate speaker, the speaker of the House is responsible for the Parliamentary Protective Service, which provides security to Parliament Hill with the Royal Canadian Mounted Police (RCMP).

The term "speaker" originates from the British parliamentary tradition.

The speaker and their deputies preside over debates of the House of Commons, invite particular members to speak, maintain order and decorum (including reproving members who misbehave), and make rulings on points of order and points of privilege. By parliamentary rule and tradition, all statements in the House are addressed to the speaker, never to another member. For example, one does not say, "Prime Minister, will you explain to this House...", or "Thank you for the question." Instead, one would say, "Mr. Speaker, will the Prime Minister explain to this House..." or "Madam Speaker, I thank the honourable member for her question." Members are not allowed to speak while the speaker is speaking, and must sit down when the speaker rises to speak.

By convention, speakers are normally addressed in Parliament as "Mr. Speaker," for a man, and "Madam Speaker", for a woman. Deputies of the speaker who are presiding at a given time are also addressed as "Mr./Madam Speaker."

Election

While the Constitution requires that the speaker be elected by the House of Commons, traditionally this amounted to the rubber-stamp approval of an MP nominated by the prime minister. However, in 1986 this was changed and they are now selected by secret ballot. The speaker remains a sitting MP, but only votes on matters in the case of a tie.

All MPs except for Cabinet ministers and party leaders are eligible to run for speaker. Any MP who does not wish to put their name forward must issue a letter withdrawing from the ballot by the day before the vote. All MPs who do not remove their name from the ballot as of 6pm the day before the election are listed as candidates on the ballot and are allowed a five-minute speech to persuade their colleagues as to why they should be elected.

The election is presided over by the dean of the House, currently Louis Plamondon, who is the longest continuously serving MP who is not in Cabinet.

All candidates who receive less than 5% of the vote are removed from the ballot. If no candidate received less than 5% of the vote then the MP with the fewest vote drops off. This continues, with a one-hour break between ballots, until one candidate receives more than 50% of the vote. In the event of a tie on the final ballot, the ballot is taken again. This happened once, in 1993, when Gilbert Parent won over Jean-Robert Gauthier.

The winner is escorted to the speaker's chair by the prime minister and leader of the Official Opposition. The newly elected speaker, by tradition, feigns reluctance as they are "dragged" to the chair in a practice dating from the days when British speakers risked execution if the news they reported to the king was displeasing.

On June 2, 2011, Conservative Andrew Scheer (Regina—Qu'Appelle) was elected speaker, defeating the following MPs over the course of six ballots: New Democrat Denise Savoie (Victoria (electoral district)) and Conservatives Dean Allison (Niagara West—Glanbrook), Barry Devolin (Haliburton—Kawartha Lakes—Brock), Ed Holder (London West), Lee Richardson (Calgary Centre), Bruce Stanton (Simcoe North), and Merv Tweed (Brandon—Souris). Scheer was the youngest Speaker in Canadian history.

On December 2, 2015, Geoff Regan was elected speaker by members of the 42nd Parliament over fellow Liberal candidates Denis Paradis, Yasmin Ratansi and Conservative Bruce Stanton. Regan won on the first ballot and is the first speaker from Atlantic Canada in nearly a hundred years since Nova Scotian Edgar Nelson Rhodes in 1922.

Anthony Rota was elected as 37th speaker on December 5, 2019, by winning a ranked ballot between himself, Joël Godin, Carol Hughes, Geoff Regan (the speaker during the previous Parliament), and Bruce Stanton. Following Rota's win, the Conservatives said that he had them to thank for his new election, after they decided in a Conservative caucus meeting to unseat Regan as a show of strength to the Liberal minority government. They did so by ranking Regan further down on the ranked ballot.

Opposition speakers
The speaker usually comes from among MPs of the governing party. But because they cannot vote unless their vote would break a tie and by convention must vote to maintain the status quo (which includes voting confidence in the government), a minority government can slightly weaken the opposition's power by electing an opposition speaker.

Speakers have been elected from opposition parties during the 1926 tenure of Arthur Meighen's Conservative ministry, the 1979 ministry of Progressive Conservative Joe Clark, and Stephen Harper's Conservative Ministry from 2006 to 2011. In the 39th Parliament, three opposition members, Peter Milliken, Diane Marleau and Marcel Proulx, ran for speaker. In 1957, when John Diefenbaker took power with a minority Progressive Conservative government, he offered the speaker's chair to Stanley Knowles of the opposition Co-operative Commonwealth Federation – the precursor to the New Democratic Party (NDP) – who declined. So far, every speaker from an opposition party has been a Liberal.

Impartiality
The speaker is required to perform their office impartially, but does not resign from their party membership upon taking office, as is done in the United Kingdom. Speaker Lucien Lamoureux decided to follow the custom of the Speaker of the House of Commons of the United Kingdom and ran in the 1968 election as an independent. Both the Liberal Party and the Progressive Conservative Party agreed not to run candidates against him. The New Democratic Party, however, declined to withdraw their candidate. Lamoureux was re-elected and continued to serve as speaker. However, in the 1972 election, the opposition parties did not come to an agreement and ran candidates against him. Lamoureux was again returned but no subsequent speakers have repeated his attempt to run as an independent. The opposition parties may have chosen not to follow the 1968 precedent because of how close the election was: it produced a Liberal minority government with just two more seats than the Conservatives.

Tie-breaking votes

On May 19, 2005, Speaker Peter Milliken was required to cast the tie-breaking vote during a confidence measure for the first time in Canadian history. Faced with the defeat of Paul Martin's minority government, Milliken voted in favour of the NDP budget amendment. Despite popular belief that the speaker, as a Liberal MP, would automatically support the government, his vote was pre-determined by other factors. As speaker, Milliken's vote must be cast to allow the continuation of debate, or to maintain the status quo, a reflection of Speaker Denison's rule practiced in the British House of Commons. Thus, the speaker voted in favour of second reading, "to allow the House time for further debate so that it can make its own decision at some future time." The bill would later pass third reading without the need for Milliken's vote.

Speakers have only needed to vote in order to break a tie 11 times in Canadian parliamentary history. Milliken did so on five occasions, almost more than all previous speakers combined.

Deputy speaker
In addition to the speaker, a deputy speaker, also known as the Chair of Committees (of the whole,) is elected at the beginning of each parliament to act in place of the speaker when the latter is unavailable. Under the Standing Orders, the speaker, after consulting with each of the party leaders, nominates a candidate for deputy speaker to the House, which then votes on that nomination. The deputy speaker presides over daily sessions of the House when the speaker is not in the chair. The deputy speaker also chairs the House when it sits as a Committee of the Whole. Other presiding officers, the deputy chair of committees and the assistant deputy chair of committees, are chosen each session to occupy the chair when the speaker and deputy speaker are not available. The deputy speaker and the other presiding officers are members of the Panel of Chairs, and can therefore be selected by the speaker to chair legislative committees. Like the speaker, the deputy speaker has a role in administering the House.

The deputy speaker of the 44th Canadian Parliament was Chris d'Entremont (Conservative); and the assistant deputy speaker was Carol Hughes (NDP).

The Chair of Committees is vested by Subsection 43(1) of the Parliament of Canada Act with full and adequate authority to address matters in the titular Speaker's absence: "Whenever the House of Commons is informed of the unavoidable absence of the Speaker thereof by the Clerk at the table, the Chairman of Committees, if present, shall take the chair and perform the duties and exercise the authority of Speaker in relation to all the proceedings of the House, as Deputy Speaker."

Retirement
Most former speakers retire from Parliament after their tenure as speaker, sometimes after returning to the backbench for a period. Several have been appointed to diplomatic positions, summoned to the Senate, or appointed to a vice-regal position such as lieutenant-governor of a province or, in two cases, governor general of Canada (Roland Michener and Jeanne Sauvé). While several former Cabinet ministers have served as speaker or stood for the position, no former speakers have subsequently been appointed to Cabinet. One speaker, Andrew Scheer, has gone on to assume a front bench position in the House of Commons: Scheer became leader of the Conservative Party of Canada in 2017 and served as leader of the Opposition from 2017 to 2020.

Honorary Speaker

On March 9, 2016 Liberal MP Mauril Bélanger served as honorary speaker for about an hour to honour his years of service. Speaker Regan resumed his duties for the remainder of the sitting of the House.

Mauril Bélanger had initially been considered a front runner for the post of Speaker the previous year, but had withdrawn due to his being diagnosed with amyotrophic lateral sclerosis. Bélanger died on August 15, 2016, five months after being named honorary speaker.

Counterparts
The speaker's counterpart in the upper house is the speaker of the Senate of Canada. Canadian provincial and territorial legislatures also have speakers with much the same roles. The position was preceded by the speaker of the Legislative Assembly of the Province of Canada.

List of speakers of the House of Commons

Key:

References

External links
Parliamentary Library of Canada - contains biographies of all of Canada's speakers and information on the historical development and current role of the position.

Government of Canada

Westminster system